The Bloyd Shale is a geologic formation in Arkansas. It preserves fossils dating back to the Carboniferous period.

See also

 List of fossiliferous stratigraphic units in Arkansas
 Paleontology in Arkansas

References
 

Carboniferous Arkansas
Carboniferous southern paleotropical deposits